Caleb Sean was born Caleb Sean McCampbell on July 3, 1986. Born into a family of musicians, Caleb began to sing and play the piano at the age of three. By the age of seven he was involved in piano recitals at his elementary school, and was playing for the children's choir at his home church in Dallas, TX. His father was a member of the Mac Band, a pop/r&b band that gained popularity with the #1 hit "Roses are Red" in the early 90s, and his mother was a vocalist in the band Soul Liberation.  Caleb was heavily influenced by singing and playing at church and school, but became familiar with the music industry through learning from his father's experiences. Caleb began singing with his four siblings, and by high school was gaining favor through playing different musical gigs in the Dallas/Ft. Worth area.

Education

At an early age, Caleb began his musical training studying under musicians in his family, and continued his musical education through formal instruction beginning at the age of seven. By the age of thirteen, Caleb was a trained vocalist, pianist, and drummer and began to act and model during middle school and high school. While attending Booker T. Washington High School for the Performing and Visual Arts, Caleb was a recipient of the prestigious Downbeat award for “Outstanding Performance” in the categories of “Best Instrumental Soloist” and “Best Original Jazz Composition".  After graduating from high school, Caleb continued his education at Cedar Valley College, earning an associate degree in Applied Science for Commercial Music/Performing Musician. After graduation, Sean was offered a teaching position at Cedar Valley, and became an adjunct professor of Jazz studies there for two years.

Career

Caleb began his career at the age of three, recording his first nationally aired commercial for Proline’s “Just for Me” hair care product. He continued to pursue his music studies throughout high school, playing for local churches, weddings, and other musical venues. Developing a passion for many different styles of music, Caleb played keys for country, blues, jazz, gospel, contemporary, and pop artists. Caleb traveled across the United States and abroad to Puerto Rico, performing at various music workshops, festivals, and jazz venues. He has also appeared on the nationally syndicated ABC television network show “Good Morning Texas” and the Trinity Broadcasting Network. He performed with Michael Buble’ and has worked with gospel artists such as Kirk Franklin, Myron Butler, and Anthony Evans. In addition to being a performing musician, Caleb also has produced music for many different artists. He is currently working as a full-time producer/freelance musician in Dallas, TX, and has produced songs for artists like Beyonce (Co-Produced Best Thing I Never Had), Talib Kweli, and Rhymefest, and has worked in the studio with producers Larry "S1" Griffin, Jr. and Rodney “Dark Child” Jerkins. As he began to branch out into different areas of music, Caleb collaborated with producer S1, or SymbolycOne, making tracks, and eventually joined the Soul Kontrollaz Production Team, with CEO S1. Caleb previously performed  with the Jazz Fusion band The Funky Knuckles based in Dallas. Caleb has received nominations for a Soul Train Award for "Song of the Year" for Best Thing I Never Had, was a 2011 pick for the "On the Come Up" interview for ASCAP, and received an NAACP Image Award nomination for "Outstanding Song" for Beyonce's "Best Thing I Never Had", and "Outstanding Album" for 4. In 2012, Sean also received a Billboard Music Award for Top R&B Album for his production on Beyonce's "4" Album. In June 2012, Caleb won a R&B/Hip Hop Award at the ASCAP Rhythm and Soul Awards for his co-production on Beyonce's "Best Thing I Never Had".

Discography

"Wish" "Anomaly" Lecrae (vocals) 2014
"Best Thing I Never Had" 4 Beyonce (co-producer) 2011
"Murder to Excellence" Watch the Throne Kanye/Jay-Z (add. Keys) 2011
"Mr. International" Gutter Rainbows Talib Kweli (co-producer) 2010
"After the Party" Leftback Little Brother 2010
"Say Wassup" El Che Rhymefest 2010
"Splitting Image" Splitting Image Kam Moye 2010

References

External Reference
Official website
Official blog

1986 births
Living people
Musicians from Dallas
Record producers from Texas
American male pianists
21st-century American pianists
21st-century American male musicians